George Muchai (1955/6 – 7 February 2015) was a Kenyan politician and trade unionist. He served as a member of the National Assembly for Kabete Constituency since the 2013 elections. He was a member of the Jubilee Alliance.

In October 2011 Muchai survived an attempt on his life.

On 7 February 2015 Muchai was returning from a family dinner when his car was rammed in Nairobi. Several armed persons emerged from the other car and Muchai was shot and killed together with his two bodyguards and driver. A briefcase and two pistols of the bodyguards were stolen. One suspect of the murder was arrested on 11 February. Seven suspects were put on trial in 2015. In January 2020 the trial was still ongoing.

References

1950s births
2015 deaths
Assassinations in Kenya
Assassinated Kenyan politicians
Deaths by firearm in Kenya
Kenyan murder victims
Kenyan trade unionists
Members of the 11th Parliament of Kenya
Members of the National Assembly (Kenya)
People murdered in Kenya